The Albanian Homeland Party is a political party in Albania. It is led by Kreshnik Osmani.

Politics
The main point of the party is as follows:

References

Political parties in Albania
2004 establishments in Albania
Political parties established in 2004
Centrist parties in Albania